Klondike Fever is a 1980 Canadian adventure film, based on the writings of Jack London. It follows London's journey from San Francisco to the Klondike gold fields of the Yukon Territory, Canada in 1898.

Cast
 Jeff East as Jack London
 Rod Steiger as Soapy Smith
 Angie Dickinson as Belinda McNair
 Lorne Greene as Sam Steele
 Barry Morse as John Thornton
 Gordon Pinsent as Swiftwater Bill
 Robin Gammell as Merritt Sloper
 Lisa Langlois as Diamond Tooth Gertie
 Michael Hogan as Will Ryan
 Albert Kubik as card player sitting beside Swiftwater Bill

Awards 

 The film earned 9 Genie Award nominations including a Best Performance by an Actor in a Supporting Role for Gordon Pinsent.

References

External links 
 
 

1980 films
1980s adventure films
English-language Canadian films
Films based on non-fiction books
Films based on works by Jack London
Films shot in Vancouver
Northern (genre) films
Canadian adventure films
Films directed by Peter Carter
1980s English-language films
1980s Canadian films